Fröttmaning is an U-Bahn station in Munich on the U6 line of the Munich U-Bahn system. It serves the Allianz Arena and was opened on 30 June 1994.

Notable places nearby
Allianz Arena

See also
List of Munich U-Bahn stations

References

External links

Munich U-Bahn stations
Railway stations in Germany opened in 1994
Transport infrastructure completed in 1994